Robert Campbell (1882 – 13 March 1931) was a Scottish footballer who played for Partick Thistle, Rangers, Millwall Athletic and Bradford City. He was a full back who won the 1911 FA Cup with Bradford.

Career
Born in Lugar in 1882, Campbell started his football career with Partick Thistle, with whom he formed a partnership over several seasons with Andrew Wilson and won Scottish League XI and Glasgow FA representative honours, before moving to Rangers in January 1905 as emergency cover following the death of Nicol Smith. He moved to England and Millwall Athletic in the Southern League later that same year. He spent one season at Millwall, playing 28 games before moving to Division Two side Bradford City. He partnered Fred Farren in the City full back line, helping the club to win the Division Two title in 1907–08 and then the FA Cup in 1911. He played a total of 223 league games and 24 FA Cup games for City before retiring after football in England was suspended because of the First World War.

He was also a keen angler and cricketer with the Clydesdale Cricket Club. He died on 13 March 1931 in Ayr County Hospital aged 49.

Honours
Bradford City
English Division Two: 1907–08
FA Cup: 1911

References

1882 births
1931 deaths
Footballers from East Ayrshire
Scottish footballers
Association football fullbacks
Partick Thistle F.C. players
Rangers F.C. players
Millwall F.C. players
Bradford City A.F.C. players
Scottish Football League players
English Football League players
Southern Football League players
Scottish Football League representative players
FA Cup Final players